The Czech Rugby Union is the governing body for rugby union in the Czech Republic. It was founded in 1926 and became affiliated to the International Rugby Board in 1988 while still the governing body for Czechoslovakia. It organises the two leagues, the KB Extraliga and KB První Liga, and the various national teams. It is based in Prague.

See also
 Czech Republic national rugby union team
 Rugby union in the Czech Republic

References

External links
  Česká rugbyová unie - Official Site

Rugby union in the Czech Republic
Rugby
Czechia
Sports organizations established in 1926